The Negro in Our History is a non-fiction book of history authored by Carter G. Woodson and published in 1922.  According to philosopher Alain Locke, Woodson's book was one of the "select class of books that have brought about a revolution in the human mind".

References

Further reading

Non-fiction books
Books about African-American history
Books about Africa
Books about historiography